WGMB-TV (channel 44) is a television station in Baton Rouge, Louisiana, United States, affiliated with the Fox network. It is owned by Nexstar Media Group alongside CW owned-and-operated station WBRL-CD (channel 21) and independent station KZUP-CD (channel 19); Nexstar also provides certain services to NBC affiliate WVLA-TV (channel 33) under joint sales and shared services agreements (JSA/SSA) with White Knight Broadcasting. The stations share studios on Perkins Road in Baton Rouge, while WGMB-TV's transmitter is located near Addis, Louisiana.

History
The station first signed on August 11, 1991, making Baton Rouge the last of the Top 100 Nielsen Designated Market Areas to receive a Fox affiliate. The station was originally owned by the Galloway family, whose broadcast holdings operated under the Communications Corporation of America banner. It took five years to bring Fox to Baton Rouge, as the Federal Communications Commission (FCC) assigned channel 44 to Baton Rouge in 1983 and several potential buyers sought a license. One company, Parish Family Television expressed an interest in broadcasting an independent station affiliated with the network in 1986 with the call letters WPFT. Delays occurred as Southwest Multimedia of Houston expressed an ownership interest in Parish Family Television and rival company Louisiana Super Communications objected to this sale. After Southwest Multimedia bowed out of the ownership stake, Thomas Galloway of Lafayette purchased the license from PFTV in November 1990 as well as the Texas stations KVEO, KWKT, and KPEJ from Southwest Multimedia. The station installed an antenna on WVLA's tower, bought from future sister station WNTZ's parent company at the time, Delta Media Corporation. From April 1990 to February 1991, local NBC affiliate WVLA aired week-delayed episodes of Fox shows such as The Simpsons, Married... with Children, and In Living Color.

In addition to its Fox affiliation, WGMB also carried several syndicated movie packages including Columbia Pictures' Night at the Movies and Universal Television's Action Pack and was a secondary affiliate of PTEN in its early years of operation. In 1996, WGMB became a sister station of WVLA when Thomas Galloway's son, Sheldon, purchased the NBC affiliate from businessman Cyril Vetter. Sheldon had previously held a stake in WGMB but sold it to his father to make it easier for him to buy WVLA.

The station originally broadcast from Florida Boulevard, until the Galloways purchased WVLA. In 1999, WGMB, along with WVLA, WBBR (now WBRL), and WZUP (now KZUP), moved to their current studios on Perkins Road in Baton Rouge.

In June 2006, owner ComCorp filed for Chapter 11 bankruptcy protection. ComCorp said in a press release viewers and staff would see no changes at the station.

On April 24, 2013, ComCorp announced the sale of its entire group, including WGMB-TV, to the Nexstar Broadcasting Group. The local marketing agreement for WVLA-TV (which was to be sold to Mission Broadcasting, but it was later withdrawn) is included in the deal. The sale was completed on January 1, 2015.

The station did not produce a local newscast until 2007; however, it usually broadcast children's events and programming from around the Baton Rouge area in the 1990s as part of its Fox 44 Kids Club. One locally-produced show was Fox Rox Saturday, which aired in the late 1990s on Saturday mornings. WGMB also aired one high school football game each week during the fall from the Baton Rouge area in the early 2000s.

Since the station upgraded to digital, WGMB has rebroadcast the signal of the low-power WB and CW affiliate WBRL-CD on its second subchannel. On January 25, 2018, WGMB added Cozi TV to its third subchannel.

On December 3, 2018, Nexstar announced it would acquire the assets of Chicago-based Tribune Media for $6.4 billion in cash and debt. The deal—which would make Nexstar the largest television station operator by total number of stations upon its expected closure late in the third quarter of 2019—would give the WGMB/WVLA/WBRL/KZUP virtual quadropoly sister stations in Tribune's legal duopoly of ABC affiliate WGNO and CW affiliate WNOL-TV in New Orleans.

Programming

Syndicated programming
Syndicated programming on WGMB includes The Big Bang Theory, Judge Judy, The Real, and Hot Bench.

Newscasts

On March 12, 2007, WGMB debuted a local newscast entitled Fox News Louisiana airing weeknights at 9 p.m. In the summer of 2008, the newscast was rebranded as Fox News Baton Rouge. WGMB also produces and pre-records the 9 p.m. newscast for sister station KADN-TV in Lafayette, and formerly did so for KMSS-TV in Shreveport. The KMSS-TV evening newscast is now handled by sister station KTAL. The newscast was expanded to an hour in February 2013.

On August 20, 2007, WGMB debuted Fox News Louisiana AM to counter the national morning shows; the newscast, anchored by Rachel Slavik and Lauren Unger, featured eight weather updates an hour from meteorologist Jesse Gunkel. It also was simulcast on sister station WNTZ in Alexandria, although stories from that area rarely made it to the program. On December 2, 2008, WGMB canceled its morning newscast due to cost cuts; at the same time, the station also laid off an undisclosed number of employees. WGMB's sister station, NBC affiliate WVLA, would continue to air its 6 a.m. local newscast, which precedes Today.

On April 28, 2009, WGMB announced the discontinuation of all locally produced newscasts. Production of the 9 p.m. newscast was then moved to sister station KETK-TV in Tyler, Texas. WGMB also aired a 30-minute sports program called The Show on Sunday nights at 9 p.m., which was also produced by KETK. On January 3, 2011, WGMB returned to producing its 9 p.m. newscast locally from Baton Rouge.

On September 21, 2015, WGMB debuted a new set and graphics, in line with other Nexstar Fox affiliates KMSS and KARD in Shreveport and Monroe, respectively. The station also adopted the news themes "Inergy" and "Extreme" (the latter was also being used simultaneously on rival station WBRZ until late 2016) in place of the "Fox Affiliate News Theme."

On April 12, 2016, WGMB debuted a 5:30 p.m. weekday newscast. WGMB's newscast re-airs on sister station WBRL at 10:30 p.m. WGMB also produces two weekend sports programs: Geaux Nation, which focuses on LSU athletics and also airs on sister station KLFY in Lafayette, and Inside the Jaguar Nation, which focuses on Southern University athletics.

Technical information

Subchannels
The station's digital signal is multiplexed:

Analog-to-digital conversion
WGMB-TV shut down its analog signal, over UHF channel 44, on June 12, 2009, the official date in which full-power television stations in the United States transitioned from analog to digital broadcasts under federal mandate. The station digital signal remained on its pre-transition UHF channel 45. Through the use of PSIP, digital television receivers display the station's virtual channel as its former UHF analog channel 44.

As part of the SAFER Act, WGMB-TV kept its analog signal on the air until June 26 to inform viewers of the digital television transition through a loop of public service announcements from the National Association of Broadcasters.

Due to its signal strength, the station can be seen over-the-air in large portions of the Lafayette (Acadiana region) and New Orleans viewing areas.

References

External links

Fox network affiliates
Cozi TV affiliates
Television channels and stations established in 1991
Television stations in Baton Rouge, Louisiana
1991 establishments in Louisiana
Nexstar Media Group